The Civil Aeronautics Administration (CAA) is a government agency of the Ministry of Transportation and Communications of the Republic of China, Taiwan, which is responsible for the regulation of all civil aviation activities. CAA operates the passenger terminals in 18 airports, of which 9 airports are owned by CAA, with the rest owned by the Republic of China Air Force.

History
The agency was established on January 20, 1947.

Organizational structure
 Logistic Division
 Aerodrome Engineering Division
 Air Navigation Facilities Division
 Air Traffic Services Division
 Flight Standards Division
 Air Traffic Division
 Planning, Legal and International Affair Division
 Civil Service Ethics Office
 Budget, Accounting and Statistics Office
 Personnel Office
 Secretariat
 Information Management Office

Airports operated by CAA

International 
 Kaohsiung International Airport 
 Taichung International Airport 
 Taipei Songshan Airport

Domestic 
 Chiayi Airport 
 Cimei Airport 
 Hengchun Airport 
 Hualien Airport 
 Kinmen Airport 
 Lanyu Airport 
 Lyudao Airport 
 Makung Airport 
 Matsu Beigan Airport 
 Matsu Nangan Airport 
 Tainan Airport 
 Taitung Airport 
 Wang-an Airport

Other Subsidiaries 
 Air Navigation and Weather Services
 Aviation Training Institute

Director-Generals

 16 July 2012 - 16 January 2015: Jean Shen
 16 January 2015 – present: Lin Chih-ming

Transportation
The CAA building is located on the grounds of Songshan Airport, accessible within walking distance south of Songshan Airport MRT station of the Taipei Metro.

See also

 Ministry of Transportation and Communications (Taiwan)
 Transport in Taiwan
 List of airports in Taiwan

References

External links

Civil Aeronautics Administration 
Civil Aeronautics Administration 
Flight Information Region In Taiwan

Aviation in Taiwan
Aviation in China
Executive Yuan
Government of Taiwan
1947 establishments in China
1947 establishments in Taiwan